Alan or Allen Herbert may refer to:

 A. P. Herbert, British Member of Parliament and writer
 Alan Herbert (Canadian politician), Canadian politician and activist
Alan Herbert (actor) from the Captain Fortune Show
Allen Herbert; see List of Middlesex CCC first-class cricketers

See also